Wright Career College was a career-oriented school in Overland Park, Kansas, United States, that operated from 1921 until April 15, 2016. It was originally named Dickinson's Business School. The school offered two-year associate degree programs and certificates in healthcare, veterinary, fitness, business, accounting and other related fields.

History 

The college was founded in 1921 to train typists for Kansas City businesses and a secretarial program was added in 1953. A shorthand system was developed that became widely accepted in the Kansas City area. Joseph Bryan Dickinson published a book under the title of Dickinson Shorthand in 1928.

James Miller Jr. gained a controlling interest in the school in 1989 and renamed it "Wright Business College". He later changed it to "Wright Career College". The college was reported to have contracted with for-profit corporations owned by its trustees. Wright paid $14 million between 2007 and 2013 to the Miller-owned corporation Media Resources Inc. for advertising expenses. An additional $2.6 million was paid directly to the couple as salaries during the same period. In 2013, hundreds of students filed a lawsuit with accusations of "a systematic, deceptive marketing scheme" and sought a refund of the students' tuition plus unspecified damages.

On April 15, 2016, over a thousand students and 200 staff members at five campus locations were affected when the school closed due to Wright Career College filing for Chapter 7 bankruptcy liquidation under its Corporate name Mission Group Kansas, Inc. (Which held the corporate name since September 1994). All students were notified by email on a Thursday evening that the school would not be open the next day. Many students of the college have worked to file a class-action lawsuit to seek refunds for tuition.

References

Former for-profit universities and colleges in the United States
Educational institutions established in 1921
1921 establishments in Kansas
Educational institutions disestablished in 2016
Defunct private universities and colleges in Kansas
Companies that have filed for Chapter 7 bankruptcy